The Codex Vindobonensis Lat. 502 (Vienna, Austrian National Library, Lat. 502), designated by v (in Beuron system), is a 7th-century Latin Gospel Book.  The manuscript contains only 1 parchment folio (23.5 cm by 16.5 cm).  It is known also as Fragmentum Vindobonense. The text is a version of the old Latin. It is entitled "Pactus legis Ripuarie". The writing is much faded. 

It contains only: John 19:27-20:11. 

The Latin text of the codex is a representative of the Western text-type in itala recension.

The text was transcribed and published by Henry Julian White in 1887. 

It was named Vindobonensis after Vienna, place of its housing.

See also 

 List of New Testament Latin manuscripts
 Biblical manuscript
 Codex Vindobonensis Lat. 1235

References

Further reading 

 White, H. J., Old Latin biblical texts. No. III, Oxford 1888, p. 161–166. 

Vetus Latina New Testament manuscripts
7th-century biblical manuscripts
Biblical manuscripts of the Austrian National Library